Lobatolampeidae is a family of ctenophores belonging to the order Lobata. The family consists of only one genus: Lobatolampea Horita, 2000.

References

Lobata